Events in the year 1892 in Norway.

Incumbents
Monarch – Oscar II
Prime Minister – Otto Blehr (in Stockholm), Johannes Steen (in Christiania - now Oslo)

Events

 31 January – The Holmenkollen ski jump opens.

Arts and literature
Mysteries by Knut Hamsun is published.
Peace by Arne Garborg is published.

Notable births
 

5 January – John Johnsen, swimmer (died 1984)
1 February – Eugen Johansen, horse rider and Olympic silver medallist (died 1973)
5 February – Finn Bjørnseth, geodesist (died 1970).
6 February – Christian Wegner Haaland, ship-owner and politician (died 1952)
10 February – Christian Staib, sailor and Olympic gold medallist (died 1956)
23 February – Knut Severin Jakobsen Vik, politician (died 1972)
23 March – Gisken Wildenvey, writer (died 1985).
28 March – Gunnar Berg Lampe, tourist industry manager (died 1978).
31 March – Amund Rasmussen Skarholt, politician (died 1956)
2 April – Otto Huseklepp, politician (died 1964)
8 April – Aimée Sommerfelt, author (died 1975)
18 April – Lars Elisæus Vatnaland, politician (died 1983)
25 April – Max Herseth, rower and Olympic bronze medallist (died 1976)
27 April – Bjarne Johnsen, gymnast and Olympic gold medallist (died 1984)
5 May – Ingebjørg Øisang, politician (died 1956)
9 May – Einar Iveland, politician (died 1975).
12 May – Torleif Torkildsen, gymnast and Olympic bronze medallist (died 1944)
19 May – Karl Lunde, politician (died 1975)
24 May – Olaf Ingebretsen, gymnast and Olympic bronze medallist (died 1971)
30 May – Johannes Heimbeck, physician (died 1976).
22 June – Olav Aslakson Versto, politician (died 1977)
23 June – Johan Martin Holst, surgeon and military doctor (died 1953).
9 July – Erik Herseth, sailor and Olympic gold medallist (died 1993)
3 August – Olaf Sørensen, politician (died 1962)
5 August – Frithjof Sælen, gymnast and Olympic gold medallist (died 1975)
7 August – Erling Vinne, triple jumper (died 1963)
4 September – Theodor Platou, brewer (d. 1969) .
17 October – Olav Hindahl, trade unionist and politician (died 1963)
29 October – Anton Berge, agronomist and politician (died 1951)
29 October – Sigurd Høgaas, politician (died 1969)
23 November – Georg Brustad, gymnast and Olympic bronze medallist (died 1932)
27 December – Morten Ansgar Kveim, pathologist (died 1966)
28 December – Alfred Nilsen, politician (died 1977)

Full date unknown
Thomas Offenberg Backer, engineer (died 1987)
Jens Gram Dunker, architect (died 1981)
Anders Frihagen, politician and Minister (died 1979)
Nils Hjelmtveit, politician and Minister (died 1985)
Alf Sommerfelt, linguist and first professor of linguistics in Norway (died 1965)
Peter Torjesen, missionary to China (died 1939)
Herman Willoch, painter (died 1968)

Notable deaths

18 January – Wincentz Thurmann Ihlen, engineer and industrialist (born 1826)
3 February – Jørund Telnes, farmer, teacher, writer and politician (born 1845).
17 February – Johan Sverdrup, politician and first Prime Minister of Norway (born 1816)
14 October – Peter Nicolai Arbo, painter (born 1831)
25 October – Jens Theodor Paludan Vogt, engineer (born 1830)

Full date unknown
Jacob Bøckmann Barth, forester (born 1822)
Lars Kristiansen Blilie, politician (born 1820)
Jørgen Aall Flood, politician, vice consul and businessman (born 1820)
Carsten Tank Nielsen, politician and Minister (born 1818)

See also

References